Ramesh Lekhak is a Nepalese politician and member of the Nepali Congress Party. He was elected to the Pratinidhi Sabha in the 1999 election, 2008 election and 2013 election on behalf of the Nepali Congress.

On April 1, 2007 he was appointed Minister of State for Labour & Transport Management on behalf of Nepali Congress (Democratic).

In the 2022 Nepalese general election, he was elected as the member of the 2nd Federal Parliament of Nepal.

References

Government ministers of Nepal
Living people
Nepali Congress politicians from Sudurpashchim Province
Nepali Congress (Democratic) politicians
Nepal MPs 1999–2002
Members of the 1st Nepalese Constituent Assembly
Members of the 2nd Nepalese Constituent Assembly
Nepal MPs 2022–present
1963 births